Ahu a Miria is an islet in Penrhyn Atoll (Tongareva) in the Cook Islands. It is on the south-eastern edge of the atoll, between Atutahi and Tepuka.

References

Penrhyn atoll